The 2015 Caribbean drought is an ongoing drought affecting the Caribbean islands, from Cuba to Trinidad and Tobago. The situation is further aggravated by the presence of an abnormal amount of dust and dry air over the southern Atlantic. Besides the especially hard hit U.S. Commonwealth of Puerto Rico, other Caribbean islands were affected by drought conditions to varying degrees. These include Cuba, the Dominican Republic, Jamaica, St. Lucia, and Trinidad and Tobago. The drought region also extends to Guyana in the northeastern region of South America.

Puerto Rico
The water crisis has affected primarily the eastern part of the island. According to the United States Drought Monitor, about 20 percent of the island has been experiencing “extreme” to “exceptionally extreme” drought. The situation has been aggravated by a lack of maintenance of the infrastructure, whereby more than half of the water supply is lost through distribution. July, usually one of the wettest months, saw only 4 cm of rain. The Puerto Rico Aqueducts and Sewers Authority (PRASA), responsible for managing water on the island, initiated rationing in May 2015.  NBC simultaneously reported that 2.5 million people were affected while a press director from PRASA rather estimated that number to be more near to 400,000. Water supply is being shut off for up to 48 hours when rationed. As the drought affected crops and livestock the U. S. Department of Agriculture started to provide emergency loans to certain municipalities, particularly to those in the Caguas valley who have entirely loss their harvests.

Major tourist areas are exempt from rationing and continue to function normally.

The water crisis comes at a time when Puerto Rico suffers a financial debt crisis, compromising its response to the drought. In addition, an economic recession has led hundreds of thousand of islanders to leave the island looking for work on the mainland, a phenomenon expected to intensify due to the rationing.

The last major water crisis in Puerto Rico was in 1994 when rationing was implemented as well.

See also
2012–15 North American drought

Notes

References

External links
US Drought Monitor

Caribbean drought
Puerto Rican drought
Droughts in the United States
Water in Puerto Rico
Natural disasters in Puerto Rico
Caribbean